Heavyweight Wrestling from Washington is the first weekly televised wrestling program that was produced by the WWE, which at the time was a regional professional wrestling promotion called Capitol Wrestling Corporation, a member of the National Wrestling Alliance. The show was hosted by Bill Malone (1956), Morris Siegel (1956–1959) and Ray Morgan (1959–1971) and was taped at the Capitol Arena in Washington, D.C.

The show debuted on January 5, 1956, and aired until September 1971 when Vincent James McMahon moved the television tapings to eastern Pennsylvania and replaced Heavyweight Wrestling with All Star Wrestling. Morgan stayed with All Star Wrestling until he was replaced by McMahon's son Vincent K. McMahon.

References 

1956 American television series debuts
1972 American television series endings
Television series by WWE